Sub-Saharan African music is characterised by a "strong rhythmic interest" that exhibits common characteristics in all regions of this vast territory, so that Arthur Morris Jones (1889–1980) has described the many local approaches as constituting one main system. C. K. Ladzekpo also affirms the profound homogeneity of approach. West African rhythmic techniques carried over the Atlantic were fundamental ingredients in various musical styles of the Americas: samba, forró, maracatu and coco in Brazil, Afro-Cuban music and Afro-American musical genres such as blues, jazz, rhythm & blues, funk, soul, reggae, hip hop, and rock and roll were thereby of immense importance in 20th century popular music.  The drum is renowned throughout Africa.

Rhythm in Sub-Saharan African culture 

Many Sub-Saharan languages do not have a word for rhythm, or even music. Rhythms represent the very fabric of life and embody the people's interdependence in human relationships. Cross-beats can symbolize challenging moments or emotional stress: playing them while fully grounded in the main beats prepares one for maintaining life-purpose while dealing with life's challenges. The sounding of three beats against two is experienced in everyday life and helps develop "a two-dimensional attitude to rhythm". Throughout Western and Central Africa child's play includes games that develop a feeling for multiple rhythms. Because African music is not set apart from its social and cultural context, it is a mistake for Westerners to listen to African music in the same way in which they would listen to Western (European) music.

Among the characteristics of the Sub-Saharan African approach to rhythm are syncopation and cross-beats which may be understood as sustained and systematic polyrhythms, an ostinato of two or more distinct rhythmic figures, patterns or phrases at once. The simultaneous use of contrasting rhythmic patterns within the same scheme of accents or meter lies at the core of African rhythmic tradition. All such "asymmetrical" patterns are historically and geographically interrelated.

As a result of the migrations of Niger-Congo peoples (e.g., Bantu expansion), polyrhythmic culture (e.g., dance, music), which is generally associated with being a common trait among modern cultures of Africa, spread throughout Africa. Due to the Trans-Atlantic slave trade, music of the African diaspora, many of whom descend from Niger-Congo peoples, has had considerable influence upon modern Western forms of popular culture (e.g., dance, music).

Instruments 

African music relies heavily on fast-paced, upbeat rhythmic drum playing found all over the continent, though some styles, such as the Township music of South Africa do not make much use of the drum and nomadic groups such as the Maasai do not traditionally use drums. Elsewhere the drum is the sign of life: its beat is the heartbeat of the community.

Drums are classed as membranophones and consist of a skin or "drumhead" stretched over the open end of a frame or "shell". Well known African drums include the djembe and the talking drum

Many aspects of African drumming, most notably time-keeping, stem from instruments such as shakers made of woven baskets or gourds or the double bell, made of iron and creating two different tones. Each region of Africa has developed a different style of double bell but the basic technology of bell-making is the same all over the continent, as is often the bell's role as time keeper. The South American agogo is probably a descendant from these African bells. Other idiophones include the Udu and the slit drum or log drum.

Tuned instruments such as the mbira and the marimba often have a short attack and decay that facilitates their rhythmic role.

Cross-rhythm 
African rhythmic structure is entirely divisive in nature but may divide time into different fractions at the same time, typically by the use of hemiola or three-over-two (3:2), which Novotney has called the foundation of all West African polyrhythmic textures. It is the interplay of several elements, inseparable and equally essential, that produces the "varying rhythmic densities or motions" of cross-rhythmic texture. 3 and 2 belong to a single Gestalt.

Cross-rhythm is the basis for much of the music of the Niger–Congo peoples, speakers of the largest language family in Africa. For example, it "pervades southern Ewe music".

Key patterns 

Key patterns, also known as bell patterns, timeline patterns, guide patterns and phrasing referents express a rhythm's organizing principle, defining rhythmic structure and epitomizing the complete rhythmic matrix. They represent a condensed expression of all the movements open to musicians and dancers. Key patterns are typically clapped or played on idiophones such as bells, or else on a high-pitched drumhead. Musics organized around key patterns convey a two-celled (binary) structure, a complex level of African cross-rhythm.

The standard pattern 

The most commonly used key pattern in sub-Saharan Africa is the seven-stroke figure known in ethnomusicology as the standard pattern. The standard pattern, composed of two cross-rhythmic fragments, is found both in simple ( or ) and compound ( or ) metrical structures.

Until the 1980s, this key pattern, common in Yoruba music, Ewe music and many other musics, was widely interpreted as composed of additive groupings. However the standard pattern represents not a series of durational values, but a series of attack points that divide the fundamental beat with a cross-rhythmnic structure.

Tresillo 

The most basic duple-pulse figure found in Sub-Saharan African music is a figure the Cubans call tresillo, a Spanish word meaning 'triplet'. The basic figure is also found within a wide geographic belt stretching from Morocco in North Africa to Indonesia in South Asia. This pattern may have migrated east from North Africa to Asia with the spread of Islam: use of the pattern in Moroccan music can be traced back to Trans-Saharan exchanges during the Green Sahara.This influence increased due to slaves brought north across the Sahara Desert from present-day Mali. In African music, this is a cross-rhythmic fragment generated through cross-rhythm: 8 pulses ÷ 3 = 2 cross-beats (consisting of three pulses each) with a remainder of a partial cross-beat (spanning two pulses). In divisive form, the strokes of tresillo contradict the beats while in additive form, the strokes of tresillo are the beats. From a metrical perspective, the two ways of perceiving tresillo constitute two different rhythms. On the other hand, from the perspective of the pattern of attack-points, tresillo is a shared element of traditional folk music from the northwest tip of Africa to southeast tip of Asia.

References

Sources 

Novotney, Eugene D. (1998). The Three Against Two Relationship as the Foundation of Timelines in West African Musics. Urbana, IL: University of Illinois.
 
Ladzekpo, C. K. (1995). "The Myth of Cross-Rhythm", Foundation Course in African Dance-Drumming (webpage, accessed 24 April 2010).

Further reading 
Godfried T. Toussaint, "On the question of meter in African rhythm: A quantitative mathematical assessment", In Proceedings of Bridges: Mathematics, Music, Art, Architecture, and Culture, G. Hart and R. Sarhangi, (Eds.), Enschende, The Netherlands, 27–31 July 2013, pp. 559–562, Phoenix: Tessellations Publishing.

African drums
African music
African rhythm
Sub-Saharan Africa